No Podrás Escapar de Mí is the second album released by Colombian singer/composer Carlos Vives. It was released in 1987, Vives was best known as the star of soap operas at the time of its release. The album contains romantic ballads and Rock music sung in Spanish. Vives embraced Vallenato later in his career. Although the title track reached number 30 in the Billboard Hot Latin Tracks, the album was largely ignored by the public, and is a collector's item for fans.

Description 

Released in 1987, "You can't escape me" is a record made near the end of the 1980's. Despite its characteristic hair that adorns the cover of the album, the music is very different from that of Vives did with Clásicos de la Provincia in 1993. Instead where it is known Vives with the sound vallenato, the songs are mixed with the sound of pure pop Latino 80s and Rock in Spanish of the time. While Vives would make her acting career in Puerto Rico and doing what he liked "Music", this album is filled completely with a slower pace, ballads romantic and Rock much like he wanted. Vives, despite his distinctive voice, made a more commercial music attributed the interest of the record Sony Music at the time, allowing the directives and take agreement the album had this label.

Most of the album, written and arranged by the Cuban Jorge Luis Piloto, contains songs like "Tu Y Yo" ("You and I") written by Eros Ramazzotti, Piero Cassano and Adelio Cogliati, "Sin Negativo"("No Negative") of Mario Patino, "Si Es Que Te Vas" ("If you go") of Sergio Villar dealing with love and longing, this was part of the image Vives should be maintained as heartthrob star of soap operas not only in Colombia, but Puerto Rico . Apart from softer ballads, heavy songs like Charly Garcia as "Yo No Quiero Volverme Tan Loco" ("I do not want to become so crazy") with a rocker style to what he Vives and while the song "Quizas Porque" ("Perhaps because") ends with very soft acoustic style driven by sound.

In the back of the album says Vives this:

 
Translated into English and is:

Vives was nominated for Premios Lo Nuestro in 1987 Breakthrough Artist, also won the " Prize Stereo Tempo " in Puerto Rico in 1988 and " Too Much Awards " Miami, Florida (USA) in 1988, this latest award is one of the most important in the world of music awards. This is beginning to seriously consider in the world of rock ballad with these awards . I also performed at the program called Julio Enrique Sanchez and Julio Sanchez Cristo Espectaculares JES, for this presentation sang songs like No Podrás Escapar De Mí, Yo No Quiero Volverme Tan Loco, Quédate Aquí y Tú Y Yo.

Track listing

1987 albums
Carlos Vives albums